Harold Lloyd Ailsby (May 11, 1917 – May 8, 2007) was a Canadian ice hockey defenceman and coach. A career minor leaguer, he played three games for the New York Rangers of the National Hockey League (NHL) in the 1951–52 season.

Playing career
Lloyd Ailsby played junior hockey in Moose Jaw, Saskatchewan for the Moose Jaw Canucks in 1934-35, and the following year for the Regina Capitals of the Southern Saskatchewan Senior Hockey League. In 1936, he was first signed by the New York Rangers, and played for their affiliate teams, the New York Rovers and Philadelphia Ramblers for the next few years. With the outbreak of World War II, Ailsby served with the Canadian military, and missed a couple of seasons. After the war, Ailsby joined the St. Paul Saints of the old USHL, and played for them when they won the league championship in 1949. Ailsby was a Second Team All Star every year he played for St. Paul.

In 1951, the Rangers brought him back to the Rovers, and installed him as a playing coach for them. In December 1951, the Rangers called him up, and he played three games for them, wearing number 17, without scoring any points.  Ailsby returned to the Rovers, and went on to serve as playing coach in Seattle and later with the Johnstown Jets of the EHL.  He was named an EHL First Team All Star in 1957. He returned to the Rovers as a non-playing coach in 1960-61, and was replaced after the season by Rovers defenceman John Muckler, as another playing coach for the newly renamed Long Island Ducks.

Personal life
While in the Rangers organization, Ailsby met Aline Adams, an attendant at Madison Square Garden, and married her in 1941. After his hockey career was over, Ailsby and his family returned to Saskatchewan, where they operated a farm outside of Swift Current. Ailsby remained a hockey fan and supporter, and in 1986 was part of a group of local businessmen instrumental in securing the return of the Swift Current Broncos to the city from Lethbridge. Ailsby was on the Broncos' board of directors when they won the Memorial Cup in 1989. 

Ailsby died in 2007, three days before turning 90, and was buried in Swift Current.

Career statistics

Regular season and playoffs

Coaching statistics

References

External links
 

1917 births
2007 deaths
Canadian expatriate ice hockey players in the United States
Canadian ice hockey defencemen
Canadian military personnel of World War II
Cornwall Flyers players
Ice hockey people from Saskatchewan
Johnstown Jets players
Moose Jaw Canucks players
New Haven Ramblers players
New York Rangers players
New York Rovers players
Ottawa Senators (QSHL) players
Philadelphia Ramblers players
St. Paul Saints (USHL) players
Seattle Bombers players
Western International Hockey League players